"Old Dan Tucker," also known as "Ole Dan Tucker," "Dan Tucker," and other variants, is an American popular song. Its origins remain obscure; the tune may have come from oral tradition, and the words may have been written by songwriter and performer Dan Emmett. The blackface troupe the Virginia Minstrels popularized "Old Dan Tucker" in 1843, and it quickly became a minstrel hit, behind only "Miss Lucy Long" and "Mary Blane" in popularity during the antebellum period. "Old Dan Tucker" entered the folk vernacular around the same time. Today it is a bluegrass and country music standard. It is no. 390 in the Roud Folk Song Index.

The first sheet music edition of "Old Dan Tucker," published in 1843, is a song of boasts and nonsense in the vein of previous minstrel hits such as "Jump Jim Crow" and "Gumbo Chaff." In exaggerated Black Vernacular English, the lyrics tell of Dan Tucker's exploits in a strange town, where he fights, gets drunk, overeats, and breaks other social taboos. Minstrel troupes freely added and removed verses, and folk singers have since added hundreds more. Parodies and political versions are also known.

The song falls into the idiom of previous minstrel music, relying on rhythm and text declamation as its primary motivation. Its melody is simple and the harmony little developed. Nevertheless, contemporary critics found the song more pleasant than previous minstrel fare. Musicologist Dale Cockrell argues that the song represents a transition between early minstrel music and the more European-style songs of minstrelsy's later years.

Lyrics

"Old Dan Tucker" as originally published exemplifies the masculine boasting songs that predominated in early minstrelsy. Modern analysts emphasize the song's rawness, racism, and disdain for social taboos. In ersatz Black Vernacular English, the song uses short, active words such as runnin and cryin, to portray Dan Tucker as a rough-and-ready black man in the mold of Jim Crow, Gumbo Chaff, and ultimately the tall tale frontiersman:

Tucker is an animalistic character, driven by sex, violence, and strong drink. He is ugly, unrefined, and unintelligent, even infantilized. As a stranger in town, his devil-may-care actions show his problems with or ambivalence to adapting to local mores. More broadly, Tucker's disdain for social norms allows the song to send up respectable middle class American society, as evidenced by the final verse:

Other verses appear that do not go along with the main narrative. Their lines seem to be confused jabber, due to the unfamiliar slang and products of the time.  Perhaps it was written to extend the rhyme scheme. The third verse is one example:

Dan Tucker is both the teller and subject of the story. Verses 1, 3, and 5 of the 1843 edition are in the first person, whereas verses 2, 4, and 7 are in the third. This reflects the song's intended performance by an entire minstrel troupe. The lead minstrel played Tucker and began the song, but backup singers took over at times to allow Tucker to act out the scenario, dance, and do another comedy bit. There was probably an element of competition to the various dance and music solos. The third-person verses also allowed for commentary to suggest to the audience how they were to judge the character and his antics.

Individual companies probably selectively performed verses from the song or added new ones. For example, the Virginia Serenaders added verses about the Irish, Dutch, and French. At least four versions of the song were published with different lyrics during the 19th century. A parody called "Clar de Track" appears in some playbills and songsters.

Folk versions
"Old Dan Tucker" entered American folklore soon after it was written. Its simple and malleable nature means that singers may begin or end it at any point or invent new verses on the spot. Hundreds of folk verses have been recorded. This is a common folk variant:

A common chorus variant goes:

For decades "Old Dan Tucker" was used as part of a dancing game. The players formed a ring, and one man moved to the center. He selected women to swing around according to the lyrics:

The third woman chosen then became his new partner, and her old partner now took the role of "Old Dan".

These folk versions can be quite ribald. This one, recalled by a man from his boyhood in Benton County, Arkansas, in the 1910s, is one example:

The above version was recorded by Oscar Brand, with addition of the following verses.

"Old Dan Tucker" entered the folklore of slaves as well. This version from Orange County, North Carolina, was recorded in the 1850s:

It has been suggested that "died with a toothache in his heel" could be a reference to reactive arthritis.

Political versions

The original "Old Dan Tucker" and most folk variants are not political in nature. However, as early as 1844, the Hutchinson Family Singers were performing "Get off the Track!" to its tune, billed as "A song for emancipation" One verse and the chorus say:

That same year, supporters of Henry Clay at a Whig rally sang a version that makes references to Clay ("Ole Kentucky"), Martin Van Buren, and James Buchanan:

Another Clay version has the following lyrics (which also has the advantage of explaining the pronunciation of Clay's vice presidential candidate):

In 1856, supporters of John C. Frémont's run for the Republican Party nomination adopted the tune as his campaign song with the changed refrain "Get out the way, old Buchanan". William Jennings Bryan's campaign song for the 1900 Democratic National Convention in Kansas City, Missouri, changed the lyrics to say:

A version popular during the American Civil War adds references to Abraham Lincoln:

Structure
"Old Dan Tucker" is a breakdown, a dance song wherein the rhythmic accent falls on the second and fourth beats rather than on the third. The song is largely Anglo-American in nature, although it has black influences. Its repetitive melodic idiom matches that of earlier minstrel standards, such as "Jump Jim Crow," "Coal Black Rose," and "Old Zip Coon."

The song consists of 28 bars. It begins with a boisterous eight-bar introduction. Four bars follow to frame the coda. The remainder consists of sixteen bars with lyrics, half devoted to verse, and half to refrain. Each phrase gives way directly to the next with no rests between sections.

Rhythm is perhaps the most important component of "Old Dan Tucker." It begins with a cadenced introduction and little melody. Even when the tune begins in earnest, it is flat and non-harmonized and does little more than provide a beat on which words are uttered. The refrain is syncopated in a way that had only previously been used in the minstrel song "Old Zip Coon". The intense rhythm on the line "Get out the way!" generates a forward momentum and is answered by instruments in one example of the song's black-influenced call and response.

"Old Dan Tucker" was, of course, intended for stage performance. The verses are not only to be played but also acted out and danced to. Minstrels could begin leaping about at the introduction and coda, beginning the full music at the vocal section. Performers probably included instrumental versions of the chorus while they played, a rare practice in early minstrelsy.

Musicologist Dale Cockrell argues that "Old Dan Tucker" represents a bridge between the percussive blackface songs of the 1830s and the more refined compositions of songwriters such as Stephen Foster. Cockrell says that, unlike previous minstrel songs, "Old Dan Tucker" is meant for more than just dancing; its tune is developed enough to stand on its own. Contemporary critics certainly noticed the difference. Y. S. Nathanson called it "the best of what I have denominated the ancient negro ballads. The melody is far superior to anything that had preceded it." Nathanson compared the song to works by Gaetano Donizetti and Daniel Auber.

Composition

The origin of the music of "Old Dan Tucker" has always been obscure, and no sheet music edition from 1843, the year of its first publication, names a composer. The first performance of the tune (but not lyrics) may have happened as early as 1841. The song has been alleged to refer to the notorious Daniel Tucker (1575-1625) of Jamestown Colony, Virginia, and Bermuda. The music may be from the oral tradition or may have been a product of collaboration.

"Old Dan Tucker" has been credited to at least three different songwriters: Dan Emmett, J. R. Jenkins, and Henry Russell. In his old age, Emmett related the traditional story to his biographer, H. Ogden Wintermute: "I composed Old Dan Tucker in 1830 or 1831, when I was fifteen or sixteen years old." The biography says that Emmett first played the song in public at a performance by a group of traveling entertainers. They lacked a fiddle player, and the local innkeeper suggested young Emmett to fill in. Emmett played "Old Dan Tucker" to the troupe manager's liking, and he debuted on the Mount Vernon, Ohio village green in blackface to perform the song on the Fourth of July. Wintermute says that the name Dan Tucker is a combination of Emmett's own name and that of his dog. However, there is no evidence for any of this. Instead, Emmett may merely have written the words. Even these seem to partially derive from an earlier minstrel song called "Walk Along John" or "Oh, Come Along John", first published in various songsters in the early 1840s. Some verses have clear echoes in versions of "Old Dan Tucker":

The Charles Keith company published "Old Dan Tucker" in Boston, Massachusetts, in 1843. The sheet music credits words to Dan Emmett but says that the song is from "Old Dan Emmit's Original Banjo Melodies." The lack of attribution of the melody may be another sign that Emmett did not write it.

Possible slave origin

A story dating to at least 1965 says that "Old Dan Tucker" was written by slaves about a man named Daniel Tucker who lived in Elbert County, Georgia. Tucker was a farmer, ferryman, and minister who appears in records from the late 18th and early 19th centuries. The story, as related by Mrs. Guy Rucker, the great-great-granddaughter of one of Tucker's neighbors, claims that Tucker became quite well liked by the slaves in his area through his ministry to them.

According to this interpretation, the lyrics address Tucker directly. The chorus, "You're too late to get your supper" is a kindhearted taunt to a man who often arrived after dark, forcing his hosts to scrape up a meal for him. The song's occasional lewdness is explained by the natural impromptu nature of its supposed origin.

"Old Dan Tucker" does show evidence of black influence. For example, bizarre imagery in folk versions of the song (e.g., "toothache in his heel") may be a sign of legitimate black input (or of someone poking fun of slaves who had an incomplete knowledge of English). "Old Dan Tucker" most closely resembles African music in its call-and-response refrain.

Daniel Tucker was buried in Elbert County in 1818. The Elbert County Chamber of Commerce today promotes his grave as a tourist attraction due to his possible connection with the character from the song.

Popularity

In December 1842 and January 1843, Dan Emmett portrayed the character Old Dan Tucker in solo and duo performances; the playbills do not indicate whether he included the song in his act. The Virginia Minstrels probably made "Old Dan Tucker" a regular part of their show beginning with their first performance at the Bowery Amphitheatre on February 6, 1843. Their minstrel show also included a comic scene loosely based on the song, "Dan Tucker on Horseback," about a black riding master. The piece starred Richard Pelham in the title role and Frank Brower as a black clown. "Old Dan Tucker" did not appear on a Virginia Minstrels playbill until a March 7 and 8 performance at Boston's Masonic Temple. There, the playbill described it as "OLD DAN TUCKER, a Virginian Refrain, in which is described the ups and downs of Negro life." As early as February 15, Emmett billed himself as "Old Dan Emmett."

By the end of March, "Old Dan Tucker" was a hit, and it quickly became the Virginia Minstrels' most popular song. Robert Winans found the song on 49% of the minstrel playbills he surveyed from the 1843–1847 period (behind only "Miss Lucy Long"), and research by musicologist William J. Mahar suggests that it was behind only "Mary Blane" and "Lucy Long" in its frequency of publication in antebellum songsters. The next year, Dan Tucker returned in the popular "Ole Bull and Old Dan Tucker," which pits him against Ole Bull in a contest of skill. Sequels such as "De New Ole Dan Tucker" and "Old Dan Tucker's Wedding" followed. Other companies adopted Tucker for comedy sketches, such as burlesques of La sonnambula by Buckley's Serenaders in 1850 and Sanford's Opera Troupe in 1853.

The song became so identified with Emmett and the Virginia Minstrels that it became part of their foundation myth. Billy Whitlock and George B. Wooldridge both claimed that the troupe members played "Old Dan Tucker" in their first impromptu performance together:

... as if by accident, each one picked up his tools and joined in a chorus of "Old Dan Tucker," while Emmett was playing and singing. It went well, and they repeated it without saying a word. Each did his best, and such a rattling of the principal and original instruments in a minstrel band was never heard before.

Emmett repeated this story in the May 19, 1877, New York Clipper, although other details changed. The press began to refer to Emmett as "Ole Dan Tucker," and Emmett eventually adopted the nickname. The Virginia Minstrels sometimes went by "Ole Dan Tucker and Co." They were called "Old Dan Tucker & Co.," either by themselves or by the press, as early as February 16, 1843.

The song's disdain for the customs of the upper classes hit a chord with working class audiences. On January 28, 1843, The New York Sporting Whip reported that the song had been adopted by a Philadelphia, Pennsylvania, street gang called the Hallow Guards. As their leader, Stovepipe Bill, led them against a military raid, he sang the verses followed by the gang singing the chorus. Two years later, The Knickerbocker remarked, "At this present moment, a certain ubiquitous person seems to be in the way of the whole people of these United States simultaneously." Nathanson claimed that "Old Dan Tucker" had "been sung, perhaps, oftener than any melody ever written."

In 1871, 28 years after its first published edition, Board and Trade listed editions of "Old Dan Tucker" in print from seven different publishers. The song had by default fallen into the public domain. In later decades, "Old Dan Tucker" became a standard of bluegrass and country music, with recordings by such artists as Fiddlin' John Carson, Uncle Dave Macon, Pete Seeger, and Gid Tanner and his Skillet Lickers.

Notes

References

 The Canebrake Minstrels (2003), Website  for Finer than Froghair. Accessed September 17, 2006.
 Cantwell, Robert (2003). Bluegrass Breakdown: The Making of the Old Southern Sound. Urbana: University of Illinois Press.
 Casey, Betty (1985). Dance across Texas. Austin: University of Texas Press.
 Chase, Gilbert (1987). America's Music: From the Pilgrims to the Present. 3rd ed. Urbana: University of Illinois Press.
 Cockrell, Dale (1997). Demons of Disorder: Early Blackface Minstrels and Their World. Cambridge University Press.
 Crawford, Richard (2001). America's Musical Life: A History. New York: W. W. Norton & Company, Inc.
 Elbert County Chamber of Commerce (no date). Old Dan Tucker. Tourist pamphlet.
 Forcucci, Samuel L. (1984). A Folk Song History of America: America through Its Songs. Englewood Cliffs, New Jersey: Prentice-Hall, Inc.
 Galbreath, C. B. (1901). "Song Writers of Ohio". Ohio Archæological and Historical Publications. Vol. XIII.
 Gardner, Emelyn E. (1920) "Some Play-party Games in Michigan". The Journal of American Folk-lore Vol. 33. Lancaster, Pennsylvania: The American Folk-lore Society.
 Harland, Marion (1910). Marion Harland's Autobiography: The Story of a Long Life. New York City: Harper & Brothers Publishers.
 Knowles, Mark (2002). Tap Roots: The Early History of Tap Dancing. Jefferson, North Carolina: McFarland & Company, Publishers. .
 Lawrence, Vera Brodsky (1988). Strong on Music: The New York Music Scene in the Days of George Templeton Strong. Volume I: Resonances, 1838–1849. The University of Chicago Press.
 Lott, Eric (1995). Love and Theft: Blackface Minstrelsy and the American Working Class. Oxford University Press. .
 Lomax, John A., and Lomax, Alan (1934). American Ballads and Folk Songs. New York: The Macmillan Company.
Mahar, William J. (1999). Behind the Burnt Cork Mask: Early Blackface Minstrelsy and Antebellum American Popular Culture. Chicago: University of Illinois Press.
 Malone, Bill C. (2002). Don't Get above Your Raisin': Country Music and the Southern Working Class. Urbana: University of Illinois Press.
 May, Robert E. (2002). Manifest Destiny's Underworld: Filibustering in Antebellum America. Chapel Hill: The University of North Carolina Press.
 Nathan, Hans (1962). Dan Emmett and the Rise of Early Negro Minstrelsy. Norman: University of Oklahoma Press.
 Rammel, Hal (1990). Nowhere in America: The Big Rock Candy Mountain and Other Comic Utopias. Urbana, Illinois: University of Illinois Press.
 Randolph, Vance (1992). Roll Me in Your Arms: "Unprintable" Ozark Folksongs and Folklore. Vol I: Folksongs and Music. Fayetteville: The University of Arkansas Press.
 Silber, Irwin (1960). Songs of the Civil War. Mineola, New York: Dover Publications.
 Stearns, Marshall, and Stearns, Jeanne (1968). Jazz Dance: The Story of American Vernacular Dance. New York City: Da Capo Press.
 Tracy, Steven C. (1993). Going to Cincinnati: A History of the Blues in the Queen City. Urbana: University of Illinois Press.
 Waltz, Robert (August 4, 2005). "Oral Transmission ". A Site Inspired by the Encyclopedia of New Testament Textual Criticism. Accessed September 17, 2006.
 Waltz, Robert B., and Engle, David G. (2006). "Old Dan Tucker ". The Ballad Index.
 Welsch, Roger L. (1966). A Treasury of Nebraska Folklore. Urbana: University of Illinois Press.
 Wilcox, Herbert (February–March 1965). "'Old Dan Tucker Was a Grand Old Man': And He Really Lived in Elbert County in the Good Old Days". Georgia Magazine.
 Winans, Robert B. (1996). "Early Minstrel Show Music, 1843–1852", Inside the Minstrel Mask: Readings in Modern Minstrelsy. Middletown, Connecticut: Wesleyan University Press. .
 Yetman, Norman R., ed. (2000). Voices from Slavery: 100 Authentic Slave Narratives. Mineola, New York: Dover Publications, Inc.

External links

 "Old Dan Tucker" performed by Japher's Original Sandy River Minstrels
 "Old Dan Tucker" performed by Uncle Dave Macon
 "Old Dan Tucker" (two recordings, one of folk musicians and one of a square dance)
 "Old Dan Tucker" (various recordings)
 "Old Dan Tucker" (various folk recordings)
 Old Dan Tucker historical marker in Elberton, Georgia

Songs about old age
1843 songs
1925 singles
American country music songs
American folk songs
Blackface minstrel characters
Blackface minstrel songs
Bluegrass songs
Bruce Springsteen songs
Burl Ives songs
Fictional African-American people
Pete Seeger songs